GOR Kertajaya is a multi-purpose sport arena in Surabaya, East Java, Indonesia. The arena is home to the CLS Knights Surabaya of the ASEAN Basketball League (ABL), and Surabaya Fever of the WIBL.

References

Sports venues in Surabaya
Basketball venues in Indonesia
Badminton venues